Western Sydney Wanderers FC are a professional association football club based in Rooty Hill, New South Wales. They were founded in 2012. They then became the fourth team based in NSW and the second based in Sydney to compete in the A-League.

There have been six managers in their history (including two caretakers), the first being Tony Popovic and the current being Carl Robinson. Popovic has been the club's most successful manager, winning the 2012–13 A-League Premiership and the 2014 AFC Champions League whilst in charge.

Statistics 

 Key
 Nationality – If the manager played international football as a player, the country/countries he played for are shown. Otherwise, the manager's nationality is given as their country of birth.
 From – The year of the manager's first game for Western Sydney Wanderers.
 To – The year of the manager's last game for Western Sydney Wanderers.
 P – The number of competitive games managed for Western Sydney Wanderers.
 W – The number of games won as a manager.
 D – The number of games draw as a manager.
 L – The number of games lost as a manager.
 GF – The number of goals scored under his management.
 GA – The number of goals conceded under his management.
 GD –  The goal difference under his management
 Win% – The total winning percentage under his management.
 Honours – The trophies and awards won while managing Western Sydney Wanderers.
 Italics  – Denotes that the manager was only a caretaker during his tenure

Note: Games included are A-League (including finals), FFA Cup, AFC Champions League and FIFA Club World Cup. Friendlies are not included.

Source:

Notes

References 

 
Lists of soccer managers by club in Australia
Sydney-sport-related lists